Vigan Cathedral, canonically known as the Metropolitan Cathedral of the Conversion of St. Paul the Apostle is a Roman Catholic cathedral in Vigan, Ilocos Sur, Philippines. It serves as the seat of the Roman Catholic Archdiocese of Nueva Segovia. It is part of the UNESCO World Heritage Site declaration for the Historic Town of Vigan in 1999.

History
When Juan de Salcedo came to Vigan, he renamed the town to Villa Fernandina in honor of the young son of King Philip II. Upon the orders of Salcedo in 1574, the first temporary church of Vigan was built out of wood and thatch. With Salcedo is Augustinian priest Alonso de Alvarado who first attempted to Christianize the Ilocos region. The need to construct a permanent church and convent in Vigan was decided by the Augustinian Chapter on April 30, 1575. It became the first parish in Northern Luzon. The plans to construct the church failed since in 1577, the Augustinians vacated Ilocos. The Franciscans then came to Ilocos with Father Sebastian de Baesa as priest of Vigan. In 1591, the supervision was transferred to the secular clergy. Father Gabriel dela Cruz became the first secular priest of Vigan until 1598. When the Augustinians returned to Ilocos in 1586, they also handled Vigan alternately with the secular clergy. On February 14, 1622, Vigan was officially transferred from the Augustinians to the secular.
 
The first church was built in 1641 and was damaged by earthquake in 1619 and 1627. A third church was burned in 1739. Upon the request of then Bishop Juan de la Fuente Yepes, the seat of the Diocese of Nueva Segovia was transferred from Lal-lo, Cagayan to Ciudad Fernandina de Vigan (present-day Vigan) through a ceremonial procession on September 7, 1758. With the transfer of the seat of the Diocese, the church of Vigan became a cathedral on that same year. Governor General Jose de Basco ordered the establishment of a new church in 1786. The fourth and present-day church was built from 1790 to 1800 under the Augustinians. It was occupied by the revolutionists under Colonel Juan Villamor in 1896 and by the American forces under Lieutenant Colonel James Parker in 1899.

On July 27, 2022, the church was damaged by the 7.0 magnitude earthquake that hit parts of Luzon. 3 hours after the earthquake, the Cathedral's rector and parish priest Msgr. Gary Noel S. Formoso announced its temporary closure through the Cathedral's official Facebook page, with its reopening upon the advice from structural engineers on its safety for future use. A week after the earthquake, the Vigan City LGU began implementing a color coding scheme that will assess the structural integrity and safety of the city's buildings; due to extensive damage, both the Cathedral and the adjacent Vigan City Bell Tower were placed under the highest level of "Code Red": the affected structures were closed and cordoned off, all functions and activities within were temporarily ceased, and the surrounding areas were placed off-limits to the general public.

Architecture and design

The church is predominantly in Earthquake Baroque style with large buttresses on its side. It also has Neo-Gothic, Romanesque and Chinese inspired embellishments. In its interior are silver-paneled main altar, three naves, 12 minor altars and brass communion handrails. Located south of the cathedral is the Vigan City Bell Tower, a separate  bell tower with a square base and an octagonal form, with a weather vane on top in the form of a rooster, which symbolizes Saint Peter. Located beside the cathedral is the Palacio de Arzobispado de Nueva Segovia, the only remaining Spanish colonial era Archbishop's Palace in the Philippines, and which still retains its original function as the official residence of the archbishop of Nueva Segovia (though his private quarters are housed outside); the palace also houses a chapel usually open to the public, the archdiocesan archives, and an ecclesiastical museum which includes the palace's original throne room and  artifacts from various churches in Ilocos Sur. The church also contains remains of former bishops of the Diocese of Nueva Segovia, as well as the remains of Ilocano poet Leona Florentino (her and her husband Elias de los Reyes' grave marker can be seen on a column near the side door facing Plaza Burgos).

References

Bibliography

External links 

Roman Catholic churches in Ilocos Sur
Marked Historical Structures of the Philippines
Spanish Colonial architecture in the Philippines
Roman Catholic cathedrals in the Philippines
Buildings and structures in Vigan
Churches in the Roman Catholic Archdiocese of Nueva Segovia